The International Journal of General Medicine is a peer-reviewed medical journal covering general and internal medicine. It was established in 2008 and is published by Dove Medical Press. The editor-in-chief is Scott Fraser. The journal is abstracted and indexed in PubMed, EMBASE, and Scopus.

External links 
 

English-language journals
Open access journals
Dove Medical Press academic journals
Publications established in 2008
General medical journals